TFJ (Télévision Française Juive, Jewish French television) was a French television station. The first Jewish TV station in Europe, TFJ began broadcasting on 14 May 1998.

Television stations in France
Television channels and stations established in 1998